Adrian Małachowski (born 10 March 1998) is a Polish professional footballer who plays as a midfielder for Waldhof Mannheim.

Club career
Małachowski moved from Legia Warsaw II to Pogoń Siedlce on loan in 2017. He made his professional debut for Pogoń Siedlce in the I liga on 2 September 2017, starting in the away match against Bytovia Bytów, which finished as a 4–1 loss. He was subsequently loaned to Znicz Pruszków in 2018, before joining the club on a permanent basis. 

He transferred to GKS Bełchatów in 2019, and a year later moved to German club 1. FC Magdeburg of the 3. Liga. On 8 May 2022, the same day 1. FC Magdeburg were confirmed champions, it was announced Małachowski would leave the club at the end of the season.

On 14 May 2022, he joined 3. Liga side Waldhof Mannheim.

International career
Małachowski made one appearance for the Poland under-17 national team in 2014, and made five appearances for the under-18 team from 2015 to 2016.

Honours
1. FC Magdeburg
3. Liga: 2021–22

References

External links
 
 
 
 

1998 births
Living people
Sportspeople from Bydgoszcz
Polish footballers
Association football midfielders
Poland youth international footballers
Legia Warsaw II players
Legia Warsaw players
MKP Pogoń Siedlce players
Znicz Pruszków players
GKS Bełchatów players
1. FC Magdeburg players
SV Waldhof Mannheim players
I liga players
II liga players
III liga players
3. Liga players
Polish expatriate footballers
Polish expatriate sportspeople in Germany
Expatriate footballers in Germany